Williams High School may refer to schools in the United States:

Williams High School (Arizona), Williams, Arizona
Williams High School (Stockbridge, Massachusetts), Stockbridge, Massachusetts
Archbishop Williams High School, Braintree, Massachusetts
T. C. Williams High School, Alexandria, Virginia
T. H. Williams High School, Plano, Texas
Walter M. Williams High School, Burlington, North Carolina